Adrushy (A/T influence) Mk-II is an Indian anti-tank mine that features a shaped charge and a magnetic influence fuze. The mine is capable of discriminating between tanks and tank trawls using a sensor employing mutual induction.

Design
The mine is an "intelligent" mine with an onboard microprocessor that discriminates between friend and foe using both analog and digital signals. The explosive can penetrate more than 85mm of RHA, while conversely the mine itself can survive the blast from a mine-clearing line charge at 2.5 meters.

Features
 85mm of RHA penetration
 Full width attack capability
 Tank trawl discrimination 
 Reusable with three field-settable activity periods of 10, 40 and 80 days.
 Resistant to mine-clearing line charges at 2.5 meters.
 Electronic and mechanical safeties.

Specifications
 Length: 330mm
 Width: 240mm
 Height: 140mm
 Total weight: 7.6kg
 Explosive: 2.3kg
 Body: 10% GRP polycarbonate
 Linear: Copper
 Battery cells: LiSOCI2 (Lithium thionyl-chloride)

See also
Drdo Self Propelled Mine Burier

References

Anti-tank mines
Land mines of India